La Presa may refer to:

 La Presa (borough), a borough of the municipality of Tijuana in Baja California, Mexico
 La Presa, California, a census-designated place in the East County region of San Diego County, California, United States
 La Presa, Texas, a census-designated place in Webb County, Texas, United States
 La Presa (Mexibús), a BRT station in Chimalhuacán, Mexico

See also 
 La Prensa (disambiguation)
 Presa (disambiguation)
 La presa di Roma